The 1998 Belgian Grand Prix (formally the LVI Foster's Belgian Grand Prix) was a Formula One motor race held on 30 August 1998, at Circuit de Spa-Francorchamps;  it was the thirteenth race of the 1998 FIA Formula One World Championship. The race was won by Damon Hill driving for the Jordan team, with Hill's teammate Ralf Schumacher finishing in second place and Jean Alesi finishing in third for the Sauber team, taking his 32nd and last podium of his F1 career.

The race ran entirely in extremely wet weather, and on the first lap David Coulthard lost control of his McLaren, causing a multiple collision involving thirteen drivers, which led to the race being stopped. After a delay of more than an hour to clear the track, a second attempt was made to start the race, albeit without four of the drivers involved in the incident. At the restart, championship leader and pole-sitter Mika Häkkinen spun his McLaren at the first corner and was hit by the Sauber of Johnny Herbert, forcing them both to retire from the race. Hill took the lead, but was overtaken on lap eight by Michael Schumacher. Schumacher had built up over 30 seconds of advantage over Hill by lap 24 when he came up to lap Coulthard. After being instructed over the team radio to let him past, Coulthard slowed down but stayed on the main racing line; due to the spray behind Coulthard, Schumacher was unsighted, hit the back of the McLaren, and caused terminal damage to his Ferrari. Coulthard initially retired due to damage on his own car, but eventually rejoined the race and finished seventh.

Hill inherited the lead again, with his Jordan teammate Ralf Schumacher behind him. In the latter stages of the race, the younger Schumacher was catching Hill. Initially the team informed Hill about his teammate's pace and implied he should let him past. Hill, however, stated clearly that he would not step down, telling team owner Eddie Jordan they either race for first place and risk ending up with nothing, implying a collision, or hold positions and bring the team a 1–2 finish. Team orders were ultimately issued, requiring both drivers to hold their positions to the finish. Hill brought home the first F1 win for the Jordan team (the second for Mugen Motorsports engines) after 126 starts, bringing his own win tally to 22.  It would turn out to be his 22nd and final Formula One win, as well as the 42nd and last podium of his career.

Report

Background 
Heading into the 13th round of the season, Mika Häkkinen led the championship with 77 points. Michael Schumacher was in second place, seven points behind. Häkkinen's teammate David Coulthard was in third position on 48 points, making these three the only drivers who could mathematically win the title. With a maximum of 40 points available for the remaining four races, Eddie Irvine in fourth place could not catch Häkkinen's score, as he was 45 points behind. In the constructors championship, McLaren led on 125 points, ahead of Ferrari on 102. Benetton were in third position with 32 points, which meant they could not catch McLaren or Ferrari with a maximum of 64 points available from the remaining races. Williams in fourth position were two points behind Benetton and Jordan were a further four points behind in fifth.

All the teams, with the exception of Tyrrell, had carried out testing in the time since the previous race in Hungary. McLaren opted to run at both Monza in Italy and Silverstone in the UK. Also present at Silverstone were the Williams, Arrows and Stewart teams, with Williams test driver Juan-Pablo Montoya setting the fastest time of those present at the circuit. Ferrari opted to run at both Monza and their own Fiorano test circuit in Maranello, Italy. Jordan were also present at Monza, although it was David Coulthard for McLaren who set the fastest time at this circuit. Sauber and Minardi opted to join Ferrari at Fiorano, whilst the Benetton and Prost teams travelled to Magny-Cours, France and Barcelona, Spain respectively to conduct private testing.

Practice and qualifying 
Three practice sessions were held before the race; two on Friday and a third on Saturday morning. All three sessions were scheduled to run for one hour. David Coulthard was fastest in the first session, ahead of teammate Häkkinen who finished second despite a crash late in the session. The Ferrari and Williams cars occupied the remaining top six positions; Ferrari drivers Michael Schumacher and Eddie Irvine third and fifth respectively. The Williams were fourth and sixth fastest; Villeneueve ahead of Frentzen. Schumacher lapped fastest in the second practice session, with the two McLarens second and third; Häkkinen ahead of Coulthard. Damon Hill driving for Jordan placed fourth. Jacques Villeneuve was involved in what he described as his "biggest crash in F1 so far" when he lost control of his car at 290 km/h whilst negotiating the Eau Rouge corner. The session was halted for 25 minutes whilst his car was recovered, and although Villeneuve was taken to the medical centre at the circuit, he was not injured.

In the third practice session held on the Saturday, McLaren were again the fastest cars with Häkkinen and Coulthard finishing the session with the first and second fastest times respectively. Damon Hill finished the session third, whilst Jacques Villeneuve finished in fourth place driving what was originally designated the Williams spare car after the damage caused to his original car on Friday. The Ferraris of Michael Schumacher and Eddie Irvine were fifth and sixth respectively. During the session, Mika Salo crashed heavily at Eau Rouge, and was taken to hospital as a precaution, but was cleared to take part in qualifying.

The qualifying session took the form of a one-hour session held on Saturday afternoon; with each driver permitted to complete up to twelve laps. Häkkinen clinched his ninth pole position of the 1998 season with a time of 1:48.682. McLaren teammate Coulthard joined him on the front row, with a best time just under two-tenths of second slower than that of Häkkinen, the two drivers both having held the fastest lap at different points throughout the session. Hill qualified in third position, his highest of the season, with a time that was over a second slower than that of Häkkinen. Michael Schumacher, Häkkinen's main rival for the championship, qualified in fourth position, despite having his fastest laptime deleted, as the stewards decided he failed to slow down sufficiently when passing a yellow flag, which indicates a hazard on the track. In the event, it did not affect his position, as his fastest laptime would still have only been good enough for fourth position. Schumacher's Ferrari teammate, Eddie Irvine, finished the session fifth fastest and Villeneuve was sixth.

Race
Race day was very wet and Michael Schumacher was fastest in the morning warm-up session. Despite the heavy rain it was decided that the race would start at the scheduled time without a safety car, unlike the previous season's race. At the start Häkkinen led from a fast-starting Villeneuve, Michael Schumacher and Giancarlo Fisichella. Behind them, Coulthard suddenly emerged from the opaque spray at a right angle to the racing line and hit the trackside wall. At the time, Coulthard claimed he had made contact with Eddie Irvine, but has since said "the reality is I just dropped a wheel onto the metal grille". The McLaren rebounded directly into the path of the oncoming field, causing a chain reaction. Some drivers, including the Jordans of Hill and Ralf Schumacher and Esteban Tuero of Minardi, managed to get through unscathed.  Hill was just a few metres ahead of the carnage while Ralf Schumacher was behind.  Drivers involved in the crash along with Coulthard included Eddie Irvine (Ferrari), Alexander Wurz (Benetton), Rubens Barrichello (Stewart), Johnny Herbert (Sauber), Olivier Panis (Prost), Jarno Trulli (Prost), Mika Salo (Arrows), Pedro Diniz (Arrows), Toranosuke Takagi (Tyrrell), Ricardo Rosset (Tyrrell) and Shinji Nakano (Minardi). Jos Verstappen managed to get his Stewart back to the pits but it was too badly damaged to continue. The race was stopped before the end of the first lap, in order to allow the damaged cars to be recovered and the track to be cleared.

The regulations in force at the time stated that should any race be stopped within the first two laps, the start would be null and void, and a full restart over the original distance would take place. Thus all those involved in the incident were eligible to take place in the second start. Both Irvine and Barrichello had sustained minor injuries, and while Irvine restarted, Barrichello did not. Three teams had both of their cars damaged, each only had one spare car available, which meant that Salo, Rosset, and Panis could not restart as their teams decided to provide the spare car to their teammates. In total, four drivers did not take the second start. The second attempt to start the race took place nearly an hour after the first. At the start, Hill took the lead of a Grand Prix for the first time since the 1997 Hungarian Grand Prix. Championship leaders Häkkinen and Michael Schumacher battled for position at the first corner, where Häkkinen lost control of his car, and was hit by Herbert's Sauber, forcing both Häkkinen and Herbert to retire from the race. Also during the first lap, Coulthard and Alex Wurz collided, the damage resulted in Wurz being out of the race while Coulthard rejoined in last position. The safety car was deployed to slow the competitors down and allow Häkkinen's car, which was stranded in the middle of the track, to be safely recovered. The safety car was withdrawn at the end of the second lap, with Hill continuing to lead from Michael Schumacher after the resumption of the race. Hill retained the lead until the eighth lap, when Schumacher overtook him at the Bus Stop. Irvine then lost his front wing in an off-track excursion, dropping him from third to eleventh place as he pitted for repairs.

As the race intensified, Villeneuve spun out having briefly taken the lead during the first round of pitstops. Michael Schumacher retained his lead and was nearly 40 seconds ahead of Hill when he came up to lap Coulthard. Jean Todt had already paid a visit to the McLaren pitwall to ensure that Coulthard would move over. Coulthard did not let Schumacher by immediately, causing the Ferrari driver to shake his fist at the Scot. As the cars came down the hill towards Pouhon, Coulthard attempted to let Schumacher through, by lifting off to reduce his speed. Crucially however, he had not moved off the racing line and in very poor visibility Schumacher slammed straight into the back of the McLaren, tearing off the right-front wheel of the Ferrari and removing the rear wing of the McLaren. Both cars made it back to the pits; Schumacher immediately got out of his car and made his way to the McLaren garage. Convinced that Coulthard was at fault, Schumacher confronted him, and according to Coulthard's version of events, Schumacher both accused Coulthard of "trying to fucking kill me", and allegedly threatened to kill Coulthard. After Ferrari and McLaren team personnel separated the two drivers, Schumacher then went to the stewards' office to protest. As the race continued, the stewards considered Schumacher's protest. At the time, they found no case against Coulthard, and the stewards further requested an explanation for why the German had driven into Coulthard's spray in the first place after Coulthard had moved aside to let him through. Coulthard later rejoined the race after his rear wing was replaced.

As a result of Michael Schumacher's retirement, Hill had taken the lead of the Grand Prix ahead of his teammate Ralf Schumacher. On the same lap, Eddie Irvine spun out of the race, ending Ferrari's interest in the race. One lap later, Fisichella's Benetton hit the back of Nakano's Minardi, ripping both the front wheels from the Benetton and damaging the back of the Minardi. The Benetton brushed against the end of the pitwall and caught fire as it came to a stop, which was quickly extinguished. Both drivers were unharmed, but the incident resulted in the safety car again being deployed and Hill immediately made his second pitstop to take advantage, retaining his lead.

At this stage of the race, only six cars were running, meaning every car was in a position to score world championship points. This led to both Coulthard and Nakano rejoining the race after lengthy repairs to their cars, in a bid to get a world championship point should there be any further retirements. As the race resumed, Hill led teammate Ralf Schumacher with Jean Alesi close behind in third. It was then just a matter of counting down the laps to the finish for the Jordan team and it was Hill who took his 22nd and final Grand Prix victory, handing Jordan their first ever Grand Prix victory in the process at the circuit where they gained their first pole position in 1994 and finished second in 1997. It later emerged that team orders had been issued preventing Ralf Schumacher from overtaking Hill.

Post-race
One week after the race, Schumacher and Coulthard had a one and a half-hour private meeting and emerged shaking hands vowing to join up to combat for clearer guidelines when lapping and overtaking. Schumacher later said, "It's clear he [Coulthard] did nothing wrong at Spa."

In 2003, Coulthard admitted for the first time the crash at Spa was his fault: "The reality is that I lifted to let him pass me, but I lifted in heavy spray on the racing line. You should never do that. I would never do that now."

Classification

Qualifying

Race 

Notes
 – Barrichello, Panis, Salo and Rosset are all listed as 'Did Not Start' in the official results, despite having taken the first start prior to the race being stopped. Regulations at the time were such that in the event of a stoppage being ordered on the first lap, that start would be deemed null and void, and the second start would take place as if the first had never occurred. As these four drivers did not make the second start, they are classified as DNS.

Championship standings after the race 
Bold text indicates who still has a theoretical chance of becoming World Champion.

Drivers' Championship standings

Constructors' Championship standings

Note: Only the top five positions are included for both sets of standings.

References

Belgian Grand Prix
Belgian Grand Prix
Grand Prix
August 1998 sports events in Europe